Gerald O'Hara (1 October 1924 – 9 January 2023) was a British film and television director.

Life and career
O'Hara was born in Boston, Lincolnshire on 1 October 1924, to James O'Hara, a bookmaker, and Jeannie O’Hara (née Beamont).

O'Hara was an assistant director on Laurence Olivier's film,
Richard III; the Carol Reed film, Our Man in Havana and the Academy Award-winning Tom Jones.

O'Hara's directorial debut was the 1963 cautionary tale That Kind of Girl, about the dangers of contracting venereal disease.  During the 1960s, he directed episodes of The Avengers and a film based on a Van Der Valk novel by Nicolas Freeling, Amsterdam Affair.

O'Hara directed The Brute, an early exploration of domestic violence, criticised for its exploitative elements.

O'Hara directed and wrote the screenplay for the 1979 film,
The Bitch, an adaptation of the Jackie Collins novel.

Later television credits include directing and writing episodes of The Professionals, script editor for the ITV series C.A.T.S. Eyes and directing an episode of Press Gang.

O'Hara died on 9 January 2023, at the age of 98. He was survived by his third wife, Penny.

Selected filmography
 That Kind of Girl (1963)
 Game for Three Losers (1965)
 The Pleasure Girls (1965)
 Maroc 7 (1967)
 Amsterdam Affair (1968)
 All the Right Noises (1971)
 The Chairman's Wife (1971)
 Journey to Murder (1971)
 The Spy's Wife (1972)
 Paganini Strikes Again (1973)
 Professor Popper's Problem (1974)
 Feelings (1975)
 Blind Man's Bluff (1977)
 The Brute (1977)
 Leopard in the Snow (1978)
 The Bitch (1979)
 Fanny Hill (1983)
 The Mummy Lives (1993)

References

External links

Gerry O'Hara at BFI Screenonline

1924 births
2023 deaths
English film directors
English screenwriters
English male screenwriters
English television directors
People from Boston, Lincolnshire